Israel Getzler (1920–2012) was a historian of Russia and the Soviet Union.

He lived in Germany until about 1938, when he went to the Soviet Union. Following World War II he moved to Australia. He later went to work at Stanford University. In the late 1960s he became a professor at the Hebrew University of Jerusalem.

Works 

 Martov: A Political Biography of a Russian Social Democrat (1967)
 Neither Toleration nor Favor: The Australian Chapter of Jewish Emancipation (1970)
 Kronstadt 1917–1921: The Fate of a Soviet Democracy (1983)
 Nikolai Sukhanov: Chronicler of the Russian Revolution (2002)

References

Further reading 

 

1920 births
2012 deaths
German expatriates in the Soviet Union
German emigrants to Australia
Australian expatriates in the United States
Australian emigrants to Israel